Payne Township is a township in Gove County, Kansas, USA.  As of the 2000 census, its population was 315.

Geography
According to the USGS, it contains one cemetery, Sacred Heart.

The streams of East Spring Creek and North Fork Big Creek run through this township.

Transportation
Payne Township contains one airport or landing strip, Ashbaugh Airport.

References
 USGS Geographic Names Information System (GNIS)

External links
 US-Counties.com
 City-Data.com

Townships in Gove County, Kansas
Townships in Kansas